Lindbergh H. Thomas is an American politician, and former state legislator in Arkansas. He served in the Arkansas House of Representatives in 1999, 2001, and 2003. He is Baptist. He was a Democrat with a mailing address in Grady, Arkansas.

References

Living people
Democratic Party members of the Arkansas House of Representatives
People from Lincoln County, Arkansas
Year of birth missing (living people)